Landas is a commune in northern France, Landas may also refer to
Landås, a neighbourhood in the city of Bergen, Norway
Kyle Landas (born 1979), American craftsperson
Rudolph de Landas Berghes (1873–1920), Regionary Bishop of Scotland